Euclid Network (EN) is a European network of organisations that support social entrepreneurs. Members are based in 21 countries and represent over 100.000 organisations within and outside of Europe. EN is a strategic partner of the European Commission and an observer to the United Nations Task Force on Social and Solidarity Economy (UNTFSSE),

The network was launched in Paris in March 2007 as a result of a joint initiative by three civil society umbrella bodies across Europe; Acevo (UK), Ideell Arena (Sweden) and :fr:CJDES (France).

The executive director of Euclid Network is Suzanne Wisse-Huiskes.

Their office is located in The Hague, the Netherlands.

Aims
Euclid Network has four core aims. These are as follows:

Professional development

They offer formal training courses, peer learning opportunities, and e-learning. In addition, they have introduced a range of new methodologies such as job-shadowing.

Good governance

Welfare partnership

Sustainable funding

The biggest concern for most members is funding. Euclid Network has two key goals in this field: they wish to increase the efficiency and effectiveness of existing funding sources - some of which are too bureaucratic and stifle innovation and good practice – and increase the funding available for members. The other main activity that Euclid Network focuses on in this field, is enabling members to explore a range of income sources and new partnerships to diversify their revenue streams and increase the financial sustainability of their organizations.

Current projects
Project activities generally include comprehensive research, train-the-trainer master-classes, and conferences.

Euclid Network host the EN Impact Summit every two years. The EN Impact Summit 2020 will be in The Hague, The Netherlands.

The network's current projects include:

MedUP!

MedUP! is a programme that seeks to promote social entrepreneurship in the Mediterranean region. The project is led by Oxfam in partnership with Euclid Network, Diesis and Impact Hub International. Southern Mediterranean partners include the Tunisian Center for Social Entrepreneurship (TCSE), ENACTUS of Morocco, JOHUD of Jordan, PARC in Palestine, and SEKEM of Egypt.

The project has the objective of increasing economic inclusiveness and employment in the targeted countries by 1) promoting country and cross-country policy and advocacy initiatives and public-private interaction to enabling regulatory and policy environments; 2) reinforcing 60 social entrepreneurship through capacity-building and networking activities, and 3) providing financial and technical support to 100 social enterprises.

For MedUP!, Euclid Network was responsible for mapping each country's ecosystem in terms of their social enterprise policies, identifying their strengths and needs of pre-existing and potential social enterprise support organizations, as well as identifying successful social entrepreneurs. Euclid Network will facilitate two rounds of peer exchanges for social enterprise support organizations from the EU to the MENA region and vice versa.

The first round of peer exchanges, EU to MENA, took place in January and February 2020. The exchange for MENA peers to the EU has yet to take place.

EU Programme for Employment and Social Innovation (EaSI)

The EaSI Programme provides EU funding to promote sustainable employment, guarantee social protection, combat exclusion and poverty, and improve working conditions. Euclid Network is one of five networks within Europe that has been selected to lead the social enterprise aspect of EaSI. The social entrepreneurship axis of the EaSI programme provides support in the form of microloans or finance to entrepreneurs or finance to social enterprises.

As part of EaSI, Euclid Network works to support and strengthen those social enterprises and their support structures organizations, whether they be national federations, networks, accelerators, or incubators that could benefit from EaSI investment.

Euclid Network has developed two important tools and resources in support of its goal to increase social financing. As of now, they include the EU Funding Toolkit   and the Knowledge Center .

Peer Exchanges

The Euclid Network Peer Exchange programme is a means through which social impact leaders across Europe and Russia can create connections between the social enterprise sector and civil society. For each peer exchange or PeerEx, Euclid Network matches participants from different countries to work, face-to-face, within a wider group. Some aspects of the programme as guided but the emphasis is allowing peers to work together in whatever ways that are useful to them.

Past peer exchanges have taken place between UK/Russia, UK/Kosovo, UK/Poland, UK/Republic of Macedonia, and PeerEx TransAtlantic with participants from the US, United Kingdom, and Hungary.

Social Entrepreneur Exchange and Development Programme (SEEDplus)

The Social Entrepreneur Exchange and Development Programme is an EU-funded programme designed to help develop social enterprises in Europe by connecting aspiring European entrepreneurs, those just starting out or with only a few years of experience, with more experienced entrepreneurs, known as host entrepreneurs.

The programme is a cross-border exchange in which young entrepreneurs can spend between one and six months job-shadowing another social entrepreneur in a participating EU country. The programme is fully-funded by a grant from the European Commission and therefore cost nothing for either the young entrepreneur or the host entrepreneur to participate.

Among other organisations, Euclid Network is a contact point for new entrepreneurs and host entrepreneurs in the Netherlands.

Past projects

Many of Euclid Network's pasts projects focused on developing and connecting third-sector leaders in Central and Eastern Europe and the Western Balkans.

Past actions implemented by the Euclid Network include MY-Way: Web Enterprise, Responsible Industry, Innovative Social Investment (INNOSI), Social Innovation Europe (SIE), Social Entrepreneurs Exchange & Development for the Euro-Mediterranean Region, EU3leader, and Wego: Women's Enterprise.

Funding

Euclid Network receives EU funding through a framework partnership agreement 2018-21 within the EaSI programme.

References 

Directorates-General in the European Commission
Foreign, Commonwealth and Development Office
Non-profit organisations based in London
Social philosophy
Organizations established in 2007